Beggar My Neighbour is a British sitcom starring Reg Varney, Peter Jones, June Whitfield, Pat Coombs and (later) Desmond Walter-Ellis. Made in black-and-white, it was broadcast from 1966 to 1968 and was written by Ken Hoare and Mike Sharland.

Cast
Peter Jones – Gerald Garvey (pilot and series 1)
Desmond Walter-Ellis – Gerald Garvey (from series 2)
June Whitfield – Rose Garvey
Reg Varney – Harry Butt
Pat Coombs – Lana Butt
Rosemary Faith – Deidre Garvey (from series 2)

Plot
Rose Garvey, and her husband Gerald, live next door to her sister Lana Butt, and her husband Harry, in the fictional Larkworthy Road, Muswell Hill, North London. Gerald is an underpaid junior executive, while Harry is a well-paid fitter. The slightly snobbish Gerald makes sure that he and Rose keep up a pretence of doing well even though they are not. Meanwhile, the Butts' relative wealth encourages Lana to put on airs and graces, although Harry remains down to earth.

Episodes
Only eight episodes of the original run of 23 have survived: episode one and two from the first series and all six episodes from series two.

Pilot (1966)
Beggar My Neighbour (24 May 1966) (part of Comedy Playhouse)

Series one (1967)
Have Car, Won't Travel (13 March 1967)
Lay Down Your Arms (20 March 1967)
Episode three (27 March 1967)
An Education in Itself (3 April 1967)
Gone But Not Forgotten (10 April 1967)
At Home on Saturday (17 April 1967)
Marriage Muswell (24 April 1967)
Keep Taking The Tablets (1 May 1967)

Series two (1967)
Let Them Eat Cake  (2 July 1967)
A Host of Friends (9 July 1967)
No Bed of Rose's (16 July 1967)
Laying Down the Law (23 July 1967)
My Fair Harry Butt (30 July 1967)
For Better, for Worse (6 August 1967)

Special (1967)
Short Special as part of Christmas Night with the Stars

Series three (1968)
Old Before My Time (30 January 1968)
Ask Me No Questions (6 February 1968)
Is There Anybody There? (13 February 1968)
Whiter Shade of Yellow (20 February 1968)
Let Sleeping Dogs Lie (27 February 1968)
Grey Flannel Love Suit (5 March 1968)
What About the Workers? (12 March 1968)
Whose Baby Are You? (19 March 1968)
Drink To Me Only (26 March 1968)

Surviving episodes

References

Mark Lewisohn, "Radio Times Guide to TV Comedy", BBC Worldwide Ltd, 2003
British Sitcom Guide for Beggar My Neighbour

External links
 

1966 British television series debuts
1968 British television series endings
1960s British sitcoms
BBC television sitcoms
Comedy Playhouse
Lost BBC episodes
Television shows set in London